Cheongju Sa clan was one of the Korean clans. Their Bon-gwan was in Qingzhou, Shandong, China, known as Cheongju in Korean. According to the research in 2000, the number of Cheongju Sa clan was 7486. Their founder was  who was from Shandong and was a Gongsin in Ming dynasty. He exiled himself to Goryeo in 1372 with his eldest brother Sa Jung because he was suspected that he could assist Ming Yuzhen’s rebellion.

See also 
 Korean clan names of foreign origin

References

External links 
 

 
Korean clan names of Chinese origin